The following lists events that happened during 2015 in Saint Kitts & Nevis.

Incumbents
Monarch: Elizabeth II
Governor General: Edmund Lawrence (until 19 May), Samuel Weymouth Tapley Seaton (acting) (starting 20 May)
Prime Minister: Denzil Douglas (until 18 February), Timothy Harris (starting 18 February)

Events

February
16 February -  Voters in Saint Kitts and Nevis go to the polls for a national election with the governing Labour Party led by Prime Minister Denzil Douglas seeking a fifth term.  The opposition Team Unity, an alliance of three opposition parties led by former foreign minister Timothy Harris, wins the election, with Douglas conceding defeat on February 17.

References

 
2010s in Saint Kitts and Nevis
Saint Kitts and Nevis
Years of the 21st century in Saint Kitts and Nevis
Saint Kitts and Nevis